Daou Technology Inc., Republic of Korea, is a public multinational company that specializes in marketing communication and commerce products and services, applications for enterprise, and IDC including IT consulting service. Daou Technology was founded in 1986 by Ik Rae, Kim while he played a leading role in advancement of database management system and web technology by localizing Informix RDBMS software and Netscape web browser for the first time in 1995.

An initial public offering (IPO) took place in Korea Stock Exchange on August 27, 1997, and Daou Technology announced plans to expand its business into the finance industry. In January 2000, the company set up an online stock brokerage service, Kiwoom securities(Kiwoom Securities Co., Ltd.), company's the most notable effort to being the Nation's first online brokerage provider. Daou Technology has been a parent company since Kiwoom securities’ establishment, and possesses 47.7 percent of stake in the ownership of Kiwoom securities as of the end of FY2017.

Entering into 2000, the company focus on software and IT consulting services business for the improvement of profitability as profit margins of hardware business fallen. It has been established the partnerships with global software companies such as IBM, VMware, Citrix, and RedHat providing technical supports which factor in cloud computing, virtualization, open source, and SaaS (software as a service). The company have been merged with Unitel Network which was affiliated company to secured Web Services and supplied services such as PPurio, enFax, Minisum, DaouPay, Unicro, DonutBook, SmartPush and DCSms.
In 2010, it was developed SmartProcess which is the company's own CRM service and Team Office, designed for cooperation and communication.

It moved to the company's headquarters in Jukjeon, Yongin, named the Digital Valley in 2010.

The company's rapid growth has triggered a chain of own products, acquisitions, and partnerships. It offers marketing communication products and services (ppurio, biz ppurio, donutbook, enFax, Callmix, Biz mailer), commerce services (SNS Form, Unicro), and enterprise mail product (Terrace Mail). It released IT infrastructure and related outsourcing services (Daou IDC, Daou Cloud) in 2013. It launched Daou Office designed for work and productivity in April 2014.

Youn Duck, Kim was appointed CEO of the company in January 2016. In 2018, it launched online commerce inventory management service (Sabangnet), merging with Korea ASP. It holds 45 percent of market share by sales revenues in domestic multi-channel management market.

History

•	2018.08 Merged with Sabangnet, multi-channel product and order management service
•	2016.04 Launched TERRACE MAIL Security / Merger with delphinet
•	2016.03 Launched SNS Form
•	2016.01 Spin-off KIDARI ENT
•	2015.11 Acquired Text Messaging service business
•	2015.10 Acquired a portion of Delitoon
•	2015.09 Launched DaouOffice 2.0
•	2015.08 Launched Telpass
•	2014.11 Atlantis Computing Distributor
•	2014.09 CommVault Distributor
•	2014.07 Nimble Storage Distributor
•	2014.03 Launched DaouOffice (Groupware)
•	2012.01 Riverbed Distributor
•	2011.09 Quantum Distributor
•	2011.09 Launched Officetalk (Enterprise SNS)
•	2010.09 Launched Smart Process
•	2008.06 Acquired Terrace Technologies
•	2008.10 EnterpriseDB Distributor
•	2008.03 Established Internet Platform Research Institute
•	2008.03 Established Messaging Research Institute
•	2007.09 BakBone Software Distributor
•	2006.11 RedHat Distributor
•	2006.02 Citrix Distributor
•	2005.12 Digital Knowledge Management Award
•	2005.09 VMware Distributor
•	2005.03 Chairman of Korea Software Association
•	2004.03 IBM S/W Distributor
•	2001.05 Developed Winipmail
•	2000.07 Developed Webstore 5.0
•	1999.09 Developed integrated messaging system-Qrio
•	1998.04 Order of Industrial Service Merit
•	1997.08 Listed on KSE
•	1995.10 Netscape Distributor
•	1994.05 Registered in off board market Multi-media Tech Award
•	1991.01 Developed Korea VGA Board
•	1987.12 First domestic Korean RDBMS
•	1986.01 Established Daou Tech.

Subsidiaries and Affiliates (As of FY2018 Q2)
IT : Daou Data(Payment service and IT), KICA(Korean Information Certificate Authority Inc., Public certification authority), Mirae Technology(OTP)

Finance : Kiwoom Securities(Online brokerage service provider), Kiwoom Asset Management(Equities, fixed income, infrastructure and real estate), Kioom Savings Bank, Kiwoom Yes Saving Bank, Kiwoom Investment(Venture capital), Kiwoom Asset Planner(GA/Financial planning), Kiwoom Private Equity.

Contents & Service : Saramin(Online job portal), Saramin HS(Manpower outsourcing), Kidari Studio(Webtoon and web novel platform), KidariEnt(Visual content distribution), Imazins(Stock photo agency), eMoney(Financial content service), Wisebirds(SNS advertising agency), Kiwoom Estate&Service(Real estate development & management)
Global : Daou Japan, Daou Dalian, Daou Hong Kong, Kiwoom Securities Indonesia, Kiwoom Investment Management Indonesia

Information technology companies of South Korea
Software companies established in 1986
Recipients of the Order of Industrial Service Merit
South Korean companies established in 1986